This is a list of those who have held the position of Lord Lieutenant of Cumbria. Cumbria was formed on 1 April 1974 by combining Cumberland and Westmorland and the area of Lancashire North of the Sands part of the Lonsdale Hundred.

History
The position of High Sheriff of Cumbria has existed since the creation of the non-metropolitan and ceremonial county of Cumbria in 1974 which saw the abolition of the former lieutenancies of Cumberland and Westmorland. As well as Cumberland and Westmorland Cumbria also includes former parts of Lancashire and the West Riding of Yorkshire.

The non-metropolitan county of Cumbria is to be abolished in April 2023 and replaced with two unitary authorities to be known as Cumberland and Westmorland and Furness. The two new unitary authorities will continue to constitute a ceremonial county named "Cumbria" for the purpose of lieutenancy and shrievalties, being presided over by a Lord Lieutenant of Cumbria and a High Sheriff of Cumbria.

List of Lord Lieutenants of Cumbria

John Charles Wade (formerly Lord Lieutenant of Cumberland) 1 April 1974 – with a lieutenant:
Lieutenant-Commander Paul Norman Wilson  1 April 1974 – 1980 (formerly Lord Lieutenant of Westmorland)
Sir Charles Graham, 6th Baronet 1983–1994
Sir James Anthony Cropper  18 July 1994–2012
Claire Hensman  Dec 2012–present

See also
See Lord Lieutenant of Cumberland and Lord Lieutenant of Westmorland for Lord Lieutenants of those counties before 1974.

References

External links
Lord Lieutenant of Cumbria

Cumbria
Lord-Lieutenants of Cumbria